In lucha libre, an exótico is a luchador (male wrestler) fighting/performing in drag. The exótico’s movement vocabulary is campy, often silly, and seldom dignified. Exóticos are male wrestlers who appropriate feminine aspects in their wrestling personas or "gimmicks" – through feminine costumes, for example, "contesting the dramatic representation of machismo" and successfully unmanning their opponents in the ring while also "rejecting the outward signs of manhood". Though exoticos may not necessarily be gay, they often are, and their sexual ambiguity is undeniable. Attired with feather boas, headdresses, sequins or stockings, they defy a religious Latin culture that is ardently macho.

Meaning
Lucha libre (Hispanic freestyle wrestling) is a blend of art and sport that involves various fighting techniques such as judo, jujitsu, grappling and kickboxing. It is a world of masked luchadores (enmascarados), flying little people and flamboyant costuming, one filled with acrobatics and athleticism, all mixed with drama, pageantry and a physical comedy that is uniquely Latino origin. Everything that a luchador says, does, and wears is essential to their character and their performance. There are different kind of luchadores who represent good and evil, técnico or rudo/heel, and queers. Lucha libre is a space in which the macho-maricón (heterosexual-homosexual continuum) is represented not only in the relative positioning of men competing over who is "more" macho but also by men who have abdicated their masculinity. 

Many gay wrestlers show in their performances that they may identify as a female, but can be just as strong as a male, and can deliver a great performance just like any other male wrestler. Lucha libre is a performance that is open to multiple readings on axis of representation by two men. Many lucha libre matches cannot be described as a struggle between two men, because not all wrestlers are male, and not all male wrestlers are unambiguously men. A lucha libre match between two men represents a rudo and a técnico (evil and good), in which most exóticos end up being rudos. This does not apply to all exóticos, but the audience usually responds to them being a rudo.

History
In the 1940s, the first exóticos were seen in the history of lucha libre. Initially, the category of exóticos was formed as simply an act for entertainment; it did not reflect the life of any luchador. One of the earliest acknowledged exótico was Sterling Davis, also known as Gardenia Davis (ring name). Gardenia would enter the ring by throwing gardenias at the crowd. But up until the late 1980s, exóticos claimed that the act was just an act and that it did not reflect any personal lifestyles. In the mid 1980s, two luchadores trained by Reynosa began wrestling as exóticos but unlike previous exóticos, they did not deny their homosexual identity publicly. "The exóticos changed the exótico style from a representation of a tendency to a representation of a social category and celebrated lucha libre as a means of upward mobility for themselves specifically as homosexuals".

"I love it. I come from a 'machismo' family in which many are homophobic. I've had many doors slammed in my face, but I am who I am. What you see is what you get. I'm gay, and I've had no problem saying it." Many Lucha libre fanatics would argue that exóticos are "not quite men", but exóticos defend themselves, the thing that maricones are thought to, by definition, not capable of doing.

Interpretation
As the connotation behind the meaning of being an exótico began to change and shifted from simply being an act to actually forming a category for female and gay representation in the ring, gender roles started to change. Not only were women's gender roles challenged but they were also seen as a threat by machistas. For example, Juana Barraza Samperio was a known exótico wrestler and serial killer who challenged gender norms.

Barraza's wrestling body transgresses the normative gender and sex roles socially defined for women, thus challenging normative productions of mexicanidad. The physical strength that Barraza presents in the photograph as the la Dama del Silencio resists the "historical notions of the properly feminine body constituted as 'weak and pathological' and the culturally dominant codes of femininity that render women outside 'sports as cults of masculinity', especially in a Mexican cultural context where sports like lucha libre and physical strength are only celebrated for men; female bodies are culturally accepted if 'naturally' feminine, that is, if they do not threaten the dominant codes of the idealized Mexican, that is the mestizo and macho. As Balsamo (1996) explains, to be female and strong implicitly violates traditional codes of feminine identity".

By having a female presence in the ring, Mexican women were empowered because they were now having a part in something that was seen as manly. The female presence in the sport showed that women and gay men could do the same things as men without a doubt. This threatened social norms because the traditional Machismo does not like strong women.

Significance

Heather Levi has argued that lucha libre's theatricality challenges mainstream machismo in Mexico in the performance of certain wrestlers, like exóticos. Exóticos challenge the traditional norms of what a man should and should not do, and challenge that idea that a maricon can not defend himself. Foremost, they also allow women to empower themselves by bringing a female presence to the ring. Although there are audience members that do not take exóticos seriously, their act has helped challenge traditional machismo and has been effective enough to even be considered a threat by "ideal" machismo.

"Exóticos then contest the production of mexicanidad as they challenge the ideal mestizo-macho heterosexual) wrestler. As such, female wrestlers also challenge lucha libres traditional performances and, while women wrestlers only fight other women and cannot literally unman male opponents in the ring, they do so culturally, since female wrestlers transgress the codes of normative femininity inside and outside the ring." Although women do not actually fight with men in the ring, they are represented by exóticos since they are openly homosexual. This allows women to empower themselves even more and have a type of vision that gives them equal rights. The biggest reason why this is seen as a threat by traditional machismo is because once these women are empowered, they realize that they have the same rights as men do, therefore disempowering machismo completely. The fact that exóticos can physically challenge a man in the ring and physically challenge male masculinity is what makes the role of exóticos so crucial to the transformation of social norms.

The outfit of an exótico is known to be different regarding its style and colors. The outfit represents different aspects of their identity and their stance against machismo, while empowering women. "Her face is covered with a silver and bright pink butterfly mask. Barraza's wrestling photograph thus juxtaposes markers of her physical strength with those of femininity, codified through butterflies and the bright pink color of her suit. In doing so, the photo creates what Anne Balsamo calls a 'gender hybrid' that invokes corporeal codes of femininity as well as of masculinity. The outfit that these men in drag sport help define their category of an exótico. They create a gender hybrid in which the masculinity of a man is blended with the femininity of a woman but in an empowered form where they can compete with social norms and be accepted in an arena.

See also
 List of drag queens
 List of exóticos

References

Lucha libre
Drag (clothing)
Professional wrestling gimmicks
LGBT characters in professional wrestling
LGBT culture in Mexico